The 2019 Hawaii Rainbow Warriors football team represented the University of Hawaii at Manoa in the 2019 NCAA Division I FBS football season. The Rainbow Warriors played their home games at Aloha Stadium in Honolulu. They competed in the West Division of the Mountain West Conference and were led by fourth-year head coach Nick Rolovich, in what was his final season before his abrupt resignation in January 2020.

The Rainbow Warriors had their most successful season since 2010. They finished 10–5, 5–3 to finish tied for first in the West Division, claiming the division championship with a 14–11 win over San Diego State. They advanced to the Mountain West Championship, where they lost to Boise State, but won the Hawaii Bowl over archrival BYU, 38–34.

This was Hawaii’s first ten-win season since 2010, and just the seventh in program history. Nick Rolovich was also named Mountain West Coach of the Year, the fourth UH coach to receive that honor.

Previous season
The Rainbow Warriors finished the 2018 season 8–6, 5–3 in Mountain West play to finish in a tie for second place in the West Division.  They were invited to the Hawaii Bowl where they lost to Louisiana Tech. This was the first winning season for the Rainbow Warriors since 2010.

Preseason

Award watch lists

Listed in the order that they were released

Mountain West media days
The Mountain West media days were held from July 23–24, 2019 at Green Valley Ranch in Henderson, NV.

Media poll
The preseason poll was released at the Mountain West media days on July 23, 2019. The Warriors were predicted to finish in fourth place in the MW West Division with one first place vote.

Preseason All-Mountain West Team
The Warriors had one player selected to the preseason All−Mountain West Team.

Offense

Cedric Byrd II – WR

Schedule

Personnel

Depth chart

Game summaries

Arizona

Oregon State

at Washington

Central Arkansas

at Nevada

at Boise State

Air Force

at New Mexico

Fresno State

San Jose State

at UNLV

San Diego State

Army

at Boise State – Mountain West Championship Game

BYU – Hawaii Bowl

Source for Match-up Records:

Players drafted into the NFL

References

Hawaii
Hawaii Rainbow Warriors football seasons
Hawaii Bowl champion seasons
Hawaii Rainbow Warriors football